Jane Atkins is an American film & television writer and actress. She is a native of  Florida.  As an actress, she has performed with the American Conservatory Theater, the Actors’ Theatre of Louisville, South Coast Repertory, the Oregon Shakespeare Festival and the London Young Vic. Atkins is a member of the Writers Guild of America and the Academy of Television Arts and Sciences.  She has worked for Disney, ABC, NBC, CBS, and Lifetime TV as well as penning several nature documentaries which aired on PBS. She served as Director of Playmaking for the Virginia Avenue Project.

Positions held
Days of Our Lives
Script Writer (2002–December 28, 2004)

General Hospital
 Associate Head Writer (1996-1997)

Guiding Light
 Associate Head Writer (1994)

One Life to Live
 Script Writer (1998)

Santa Barbara
 Script Writer (1989)

Sunset Beach
 Associate Head Writer (1999 - December 31, 1999)

Awards and nominations
Daytime Emmy Award
Nomination, 1997, Best Writing, General Hospital
Win, 1989, Best Writing, Santa Barbara

Writers Guild of America Award
Nomination, 1996, Best Writing, General Hospital
Nomination, 1994, Best Writing, Guiding Light

External links

Living people
American soap opera writers
People from Calhoun County, Florida
Year of birth missing (living people)
Screenwriters from Florida